TotoGaming is a licensed online and land-based gaming operator, headquartered in Yerevan, Armenia. It provides a variety of betting products including sport and casino betting.

Withdrawal from the online betting site are only available through Armenian banks and other methods exclusive to Armenian residents.

History 
The history of TotoGaming began in 2004, when Sports betting platform was launched just a few months prior to UEFA Euro 2004. The founders brought with them the experience of the first company in the country, providing Lottery since 1999. It currently operates as the Armenian Nationwide Lottery. Over the subsequent years, the company has extended its gaming business by introducing new products. Currently the range of products provided is as follows: Sports, Casino, Live Casino, TV games, Fast games, Table games, Poker, Keno, Crash, Hi Lo, Sic Bo. The company’s staff consists of more than 1000 employees, and its services are available on the 24/7/365 basis. TotoGaming provides betting both online and land-based – through its website and betshops.

References

Online gambling companies of Armenia